Midwest Air Group, Inc. (formerly listed AMEX:MEH) is an American airline holding company based in Oak Creek. 
Wisconsin Oak Creek, Wisconsin which owned Midwest Airlines which previously operated as Midwest Express Airlines. It was ultimately controlled by parent company, TPG Capital Texas Pacific Group. Delta with the merger of Northwest Airlines Inc,. now owns 47% of the reformulated company's stock in a "silent partnership," which has now evolved into a full codeshare partnership between the two airlines.

History
The company began as Midwest Express Holdings, Inc.
On April 17, 1989, The Midwest Express Connection was created and based in Milwaukee.  The aircraft operated by Mesa Air Group.

In 1994, Astral Aviation later named Skyway Airlines, Inc., was formed to own and operate The Midwest Express Connection turboprop aircraft  feeding passengers to the larger aircraft operated by Midwest Express.

An initial public offering IPO in September 1995 took the company public.

In March 2003, the company changed the names of its operational airlines with The Midwest Express Connection becoming Midwest Connect and Midwest Express becoming Midwest Airlines.

In January 2004 the company changed its name to Midwest Air Group, Inc, which was subsequently acquired by TPG Capital on January 31, 2008.  Since this acquisition has been made, it was announced TPG Capital Midwest Air Group will discontinue Skyway Airlines operations, but continue on with Skyway Airlines, Inc. as an aircraft Aircraft ground handling ground handling company.  TPG Capital subsidiary Midwest Air group Inc. will eliminate "380 jobs from its subsidiary Skyway Airlines as it moves to outsource all of its regional airline|regional flights."

On June 23, 2009 Republic Airways Holdings announced it would acquire Midwest Air Group and Midwest Airlines from TPG Capital, only one day after Republic had announced its acquisition of Frontier Airlines Holdings the parent company of Frontier Airlines]]. Midwest Airlines is now a wholly owned subsidiary of Republic Airways Holdings.

Midwest Airlines filed a petition for Chapter 11, Title 11, United States Code|Chapter 11 bankruptcy on February 25, 2016.

Fleet
Most of the fleet of Boeing 717s have been returned to lessors, and most flights have been outsourced to Republic Airways Holdings. Republic Airways Holdings used Embraer 190 E-jets in the full aircraft livery and branding of Midwest Airlines, although the Embraer 190's were manned and crewed entirely by employees of Republic Airways Holdings subsidiary Republic Airlines.

Since the closing and divestiture saga of Midwest Airlines and the  adoption of many of Midwest Airlines routes into the Frontier Airlines route system, the only remnant of Midwest Airlines which truly remains is the two letter IATA designator YX which has since been reassigned to Republic Airlines with the complete shut down of Midwest (Express) Airlines.

Even the notion of Frontier and Midwest Routes as part of the Republic Airways Holdings System do not apply as Frontier Airlines was completely  divested from Republic in 2013.

References

External links
Midwest Air Group: about us
Midwest Air Group

Airline holding companies of the United States
Companies based in Wisconsin
Private equity portfolio companies
TPG Capital companies